Thanga Thambi is a 1967 Indian Tamil-language film directed by Ramnath–Francis and written by M. Karunanidhi. The film stars Ravichandran, Bharathi, Vanisri and Major Sundarrajan. It was released on 26 January 1967.

Plot

Cast 
 Ravichandran as Venu/Venugopal
 Bharathi as Saraswathi/Sarasu
 Vanisri as Sundari
 Major Sundarrajan as Varathan
Other supporting roles are played by Nagesh, Manorama, O. A. K. Thevar and En Thangai Natarajan.

Production 
Thanga Thambi was directed by Ramnath–Francis and written by M. Karunanidhi. R.Periyanayagam and S. P. Karuppaiah Pillai produced the film under Umayal Productions. Cinematography was handled by Sundara Babu, art direction by Angamuthu and the editing by R. Devarajan.

Music 
The music of the film was composed by K. V. Mahadevan. The lyrics were written by Vaali and Avinasi Mani.

Release and reception 
Thanga Thambi was released on 26 January 1967, and was distributed by Jayalakshmi Pictures Circuit. Kalki said the film stumbled in the beginning, but post interval it did better.

Notes

References

Bibliography

External links 
 

1960s Tamil-language films
1967 drama films
1967 films
Films scored by K. V. Mahadevan
Films with screenplays by M. Karunanidhi
Indian drama films